Once Upon a Time is a Chinese romantic drama fantasy film produced by Alibaba Pictures and directed by Zhao Xiaoding and Anthony LaMolinara. It is based on the fantasy novel Three Lives Three Worlds, Ten Miles Peach Blossoms, also known as To the Sky Kingdom, by TangQi Gongzi. The film stars Liu Yifei and Yang Yang. Originally slated to be released in China on 21 July 2017, the film's release date was later pushed back to 3 August 2017.

Plot
70,000 years ago, fox goddess Bai Qian was a disciple of Mo Yuan, the God of War. Using the name Si Yin, Bai Qian fell in love with her master. During a battle with the Demon Tribe's King, Mo Yuan sacrificed himself in order to seal away the Demon King. His soul was scattered and his body became preserved in a block of ice. Bai Qian took Mo Yuan's body back to Qing Qiu, a mystical land where her family lives, where she awaited his eventual awakening and return.

One day, Bai Qian attends a banquet where she saves a boy named Ah Li from getting kidnapped. She also meets his father, the Crown Prince of the Heaven Tribe and her betrothed. Upon seeing Bai Qian, he calls her by the name of a mortal woman he had fallen in love with 300 years prior and Ah Li's mother, Su Su. Shortly after, Ye Hua and Ah Li arrive in Qing Qiu in an attempt to bond with her. During his stay, he comes to the conclusion that Bai Qian was Su Su, and is saddened yet relieved that she does not remember their painful past. Realizing that they have developed a mutual liking for each other, Ye Hua and Bai Qian decide to wed. Bai Qian eventually learns from Ye Hua's side concubine, Su Jin, that Su Su had committed suicide and comes to believe that Ye Hua is only marrying her because he feels guilty.

Due to an artifact given to her by Ye Hua, Bai Qian's memories as Su Su are regained. 300 years ago, Bai Qian was forced to undergo a heavenly trial. With her powers and memories locked away, she started a new life as Su Su and subsequently met Ye Hua. He snuck Su Su into the Heaven Tribe where he abandoned her and left Su Su to work as a maid. After being falsely accused of a crime by Su Jin, Ye Hua gouged out Su Su's eyes as retribution. Su Su came to believe that Ye Hua no longer loved her and later committed suicide shortly after giving birth to Ah Li. Because she is immortal, Bai Qian's body returned to Qing Qiu where she drank a healing water to forget her life as Su Su. In reality, Ye Hua had broken the laws of Heaven by falling in love with a mortal. In order to protect her from the consequences of his actions, Ye Hua disguised Su Su as a maid and left her alone in the palace to keep up the charade. Su Jin discovered Su Su was actually Ye Hua's human lover and framed her for a crime. Ye Hua was forced to blind Su Su and endured her original punishment which was to be struck by lightning.

Still heartbroken about her memories as Su Su, Bai Qian refuses to see Ye Hua who waits in Qing Qiu for days. Hearing that Qing Cang has broken free, Ye Hua takes it upon himself to defeat the Demon King. Bai Qian learns of his plans and witnesses Ye Hua sacrificing himself to lock up Qing Cang. Ye Hua's body drifts into a freezing river and floats away under the ice as Bai Qian watches in tears. Ye Hua's sacrifice allows Mo Yuan to awaken, as Ye Hua was the final piece of Mo Yuan's scattered soul. Mo Yuan and Bai Qian are happily reunited.

Cast
 Liu Yifei as Bai Qian / Si Yin / Su Su 
 Yang Yang as Ye Hua / Mo Yuan
 Luo Jin as Zhe Yan
 Yan Yikuan as Qing Cang
 Li Chun as Su Jin
 Gu Xuan as Xuan Nu
 Peng Zisu as Ah Li (Bai Chen)
 Chen Xingxu

Production
On 16 June 2015, it was announced that Liu Yifei will play the leading role of Bai Qian / Si Yin / Su Su. The role of Ye Hua, the male lead, was announced to be portrayed by Yang Yang on 29 October.

Principal photography started on 18 December 2015, and wrapped on 21 March 2016. The dress design of the film was Lawrence Xu.

Soundtrack

Release
The film is scheduled for release in China (3 August), Vietnam (4 August), Cambodia (4 August), North America (11 August), Myanmar (11 August), Malaysia (17 August), UK (18 August), Singapore (24 August), Australia (31 August), Germany, Thailand, South Korea (in September) and Japan.

Box office
It grossed a total of US$82,3 million in China. Variety reported that Once Upon a Time would open in North American screens on 11 August 2017. It grossed US$485,728 in North America. Wanda Vietnam company reported that Once Upon a Time have collected VND10 billion (US$440,000) after 9 days released, it can be considered very impressive in box office Vietnam. It collected US$13,732 in UK, and was last reported to have collected US$54,932 in Australia.

Awards and nominations

See also
 Eternal Love

References

External links
 
 
 

2017 romantic drama films
Chinese romantic fantasy films
Films based on Chinese novels
Alibaba Pictures films
Films based on fantasy novels
Chinese romantic drama films
Chinese 3D films
2017 3D films
IMAX films
2017 films
2010s romantic fantasy films
Three Lives Three Worlds, Ten Miles of Peach Blossoms
2010s Mandarin-language films